KQCT may refer to:

KQCT-LP, a defunct low-power television station (channel 61) formerly licensed to serve Davenport, Iowa, United States
KQIN, a television station (channel 34 digital/36 virtual) licensed to serve Davenport, Iowa, which held the callsign KQCT from July 1991 to May 2003